Jakob Kjeldbjerg Jensen (born 21 October 1969) is a Danish television presenter and former professional footballer.

As a player as a central defender who notably played in the Premier League for Chelsea from 1993 to 1997, prior to this he had played in his native country for Viborg FF,   
Silkeborg IF and Holstebro Boldklub. He won 14 caps and scored one goal for the Danish national team, and represented Denmark at the 1992 Summer Olympics.

After retirement he moved into presenting football coverage, later branching out to host the Danish TV versions of Gladiators and I'm a Celebrity...Get Me Out of Here!.

Club career
Kjeldbjerg started playing football lower-league clubs Holstebro Boldklub and Viborg FF, before moving to Danish top-flight team Silkeborg IF.

In August 1993, he moved abroad in England. He was bought by Chelsea in the FA Premier League, in a transfer deal worth £485,000. Eighty years after Nils Middelboe made his Chelsea debut in 1913, Kjeldbjerg became the second Dane to play for the club. He stayed with Chelsea for four years, and featured in the side which lost to Manchester United in the 1994 FA Cup final. In a game against Millwall in February 1995, Kjeldbjerg dislocated his shoulder, the first incident in a long list of injuries. He injured a ligament in his left knee, and was unable to fully recover. He ended his professional football career in 1997, only 28 years old.

International career
He was selected team captain for the Danish under-21 national team which competed at the 1992 Summer Olympics, and won the 1992 Danish under-21 Player of the Year award. He made his national team debut in November 1992, and scored his only national team goal in a 2–2 draw with the United States in January 1993. He played in the 1993 Artemio Franchi Trophy game against Argentina, where he was praised for his effective marking of Argentinian playmaker Maradona.

Media career
In May 1998, he began hosting football matches from the Danish Superliga and UEFA Champions League, for the Danish television channel TV3. In 2004, he became the host in TV3's Danish version of the Survivor-concept reality show: Robinson Ekspeditionen. In August 2007, he became the new host for Onside, a popular football TV magazine.

In 2003, Kjeldbjerg hosted the Danish version of Gladiators, Gladiatorerne.

In 2012 and 2013 Kjeldbjerg hosted the realityshow Divaer i Junglen (a Danish version of I'm a Celebrity...Get Me Out of Here!), where participants from other reality shows participate in the South-American jungle.

External links
Danish national team profile
Soccerbase career statistics

1969 births
Living people
Danish men's footballers
Silkeborg IF players
Viborg FF players
Premier League players
Chelsea F.C. players
Expatriate footballers in England
Danish expatriate men's footballers
Footballers at the 1992 Summer Olympics
Olympic footballers of Denmark
Denmark international footballers
Denmark under-21 international footballers
Danish television presenters
Association football defenders
FA Cup Final players
People from Viborg Municipality
Sportspeople from the Central Denmark Region